The 1993 Supercoppa Italiana was a match played by the 1992–93 Serie A winners Milan and 1992–93 Coppa Italia winners Torino. It took place on 21 August 1993 at the RFK Memorial Stadium in Washington, D.C., United States. Milan won the match 1–0 to earn their third Supercoppa. The match was the first Supercoppa Italiana to be played outside of Italy.

Match details

1993
Supercoppa 1993
Supercoppa 1993
Supercoppa Italiana